Sweetwater Creek is a stream in western Reynolds and northeastern Shannon counties of the Ozarks of southern Missouri. It is a tributary of the Logan Creek.

According to historian Mayme Lucille Hamlett (citing W.A. Williams, then the Reynolds County superintendent of schools), Sweetwater Creek was so named on account of the hard water the stream contains, as "Hard water is often described as sweet water."

See also
List of rivers of Missouri

References

Rivers of Reynolds County, Missouri
Rivers of Shannon County, Missouri
Rivers of Missouri